The 2011 Currie Cup First Division was contested from 15 July to 14 October 2011. The tournament (known as the Absa Currie Cup First Division for sponsorship reasons) was the second tier of the 73rd season of the Currie Cup, an annual rugby union competition featuring the fourteen South African provincial unions.

No team was promoted to the top-tier Currie Cup Premier Division competition for 2012.

Competition rules and information

There were six participating teams in the 2011 Currie Cup First Division. These teams played each other twice over the course of the season, once at home and once away.

Teams received four points for a win and two points for a draw. Bonus points were awarded to teams that score 4 or more tries in a game, as well as to teams that lost a match by seven points or less. Teams were ranked by points, then points difference (points scored less points conceded).

The top four teams qualified for the title play-offs. In the semi-finals, the team that finished first had home advantage against the team that finished fourth, while the team that finished second had home advantage against the team that finished third. The winners of these semi-finals played each other in the final, at the home venue of the higher-placed team.

Following the reduction of the Currie Cup Premier Division from eight teams to six teams for 2012, there was no promotion from the First Division in 2011.

Teams

The following teams took part in the 2011 Currie Cup First Division competition:

Standings
The final league standings for the 2011 Currie Cup First Division were:

Fixtures

 All times are South African (GMT+2).

Compulsory Friendlies

Regular season

The following matches were played in the 2011 Currie Cup First Division:

Round one

Round two

Round three

Round four

Round Five

Round Six

Round Seven

Round Eight

Round Nine

Round Ten

Round Eleven

Round Twelve

Title Play-Off Games

Semi-finals

Final

Top scorers
The following sections contain only points and tries which have been scored in competitive games in the 2011 Currie Cup First Division.

Top points scorers

Source: South African Rugby Union

Top try scorers

Source: South African Rugby Union

See also
 2011 Currie Cup Premier Division
 2011 Vodacom Cup
 2011 Under-21 Provincial Championship
 2011 Under-19 Provincial Championship

References

External links
 
 

2011
2011 Currie Cup